Way Out West is American country singer Marty Stuart's 18th studio album released in 2017. The album was produced by Tom Petty and the Heartbreakers guitarist Mike Campbell.

Track listing

Personnel

Marty Stuart & His Fabulous Superlatives
Chris Scruggs - bass guitar, vocals
Harry Stinson - drums, vocals
Marty Stuart - acoustic guitar, electric guitar, vocals
Kenny Vaughan - electric guitar, vocals

References

2017 albums
Marty Stuart albums